Lerato Manzini (born 14 August 1991) is a South African professional footballer who plays as a forward for Summerfield Dynamos.

Career
In July 2015, Manzini joined Chippa United. At the end of December 2019, he was released.

References

External links

1991 births
Living people
South African soccer players
Association football midfielders
Association football forwards
Bloemfontein Celtic F.C. players
SuperSport United F.C. players
Chippa United F.C. players
Cape Town Spurs F.C. players
Bizana Pondo Chiefs F.C. players
Free State Stars F.C. players
South African Premier Division players
National First Division players
Soccer players from the Free State (province)